This is a list of all roster changes that occurred prior to the 2015 Indian Super League season.

Player regulations for 2015
For the 2015 season, the controlling body for the Indian Super League, Football Sports Development, have decided to introduce a salary cap which shall be set at Rs. 20 crores after a meeting that took place on 9 March 2015. Also at the meeting, the organization revealed other roster rules for the 2015 season which were:
 Marquee player: Each team will be required to sign one marquee player for the 2015 season. The marquee player can be the same marquee from last season but teams are also allowed to sign a new one.
 International players: Each team will be allowed to retain between one and five foreign players from the previous season and they're allowed to sign new foreigners without an international players draft.
 Domestic players: Each team will be allowed to retain between one and six Indian domestic players. Indian players who are not retained by their teams will be allowed to freely sign for another Indian Super League team till May 2015. If the players are still without a team by May 2015 then they will be listed as an option in the domestic draft in June.

It was also revealed during the meeting that each team may have a minimum of 22 players in their squad, with the addition of two developmental players. This would mean that each team should have a minimum of one marquee player, eight international players, and thirteen domestic Indian players in which two must be developmental players. Maximum, each team may contain 25 players, with two of the addition three players being allowed to be foreign.

Player auction
For the first time, the Indian Super League will host a player auction which will consist of 12-15 Indian players who have played for the national team but who did not play in the previous ISL season. Each club will be allowed to add one player from the auction list onto their roster and the players not selected will be instated into the domestic player draft.

Retained players

Atletico de Kolkata

Foreign players

Indian players

Chennaiyin FC

Foreign players

Indian Players

Delhi Dynamos

Foreign players

Indian players

FC Goa

Foreign players

Indian players

Kerala Blasters

Foreign players

Indian players

Mumbai City FC

Foreign players

Indian players

NorthEast United

Foreign players

Indian players

Pune City

Foreign players
To be Announced

Indian players

Player auction
On 10 July, the player auction took place. Ten players who had featured for the India national team and who did not play in the ISL last season were available to be purchased by the eight teams. Every player who went under the hammer during the auction were sold. The players were sold for a total of 7.22 crores.

Domestic draft
On 10 July 2015, after the auction, the 2015 ISL Domestic Draft was held, also in Mumbai. 114 players were available for selection with only seven rounds taking place. Only 40 players were selected during the draft as the draft was just used to finalize the domestic quota for all eight teams.

Player movement and other transactions

References

Roster
Lists of Indian Super League transfers
2015–16 in Indian football
India